Eudonia deltophora is a moth in the family Crambidae. It was described by Edward Meyrick in 1884. This species is endemic to New Zealand.

The wingspan is 21–23 mm. The forewings are light greyish-ochreous, irrorated with whitish. The hindwings are grey-whitish. Adults have been recorded on wing in January.

References

Moths described in 1884
Eudonia
Moths of New Zealand
Taxa named by Edward Meyrick
Endemic fauna of New Zealand
Endemic moths of New Zealand